Sir Herbert Douglas Ellis,  (3 January 1924 – 11 October 2018) was an English entrepreneur. He was the chairman of Aston Villa Football Club from 1968 to 1975, and again from 1982 until 2006. Ellis was knighted in the 2012 New Year Honours List for charitable services.

Early life and career
Ellis was born on 3 January 1924 in Hooton, Cheshire. When he was three years old, his father, also named Herbert, died. His mother Jane did not remarry but worked to support him and his younger sister, and paid his fares to attend secondary school in Chester.

According to Ellis, he attended trials for a football career with Tranmere Rovers as a child, but chose to pursue his business career rather than football. During World War II, he was based with the Fleet Air Arm of the Royal Navy in Ceylon (now Sri Lanka), and the experience of his first trip abroad inspired him to provide low-cost foreign holidays to people of a similar economic background. Before he was 40, he had become a millionaire by pioneering package holidays to Spain, with his company Sunflight.

Ellis met his first wife Audrey Slater in Ceylon in 1946. They had a son together and later divorced. He married his second wife Heidi Kroeger in 1963, with whom he had two sons. He met the German courier in Benidorm when she was working for a rival company and persuaded her to join his corporation.

Sport
Ellis was the chairman and major shareholder of Aston Villa for two separate spells, the first being from 1968 to 1975. Ellis was replaced as chairman and finally ousted from the board in 1979. During his absence Aston Villa enjoyed its greatest period of success in modern times, winning the Football League title in 1981 and the European Cup in 1982.  In June 1982, Ellis ousted Harry Marshall as chairman of Wolverhampton Wanderers. At the time he noted the club was 24 hours from extinction with debt as high as £2.5m. In November 1982 he was elected to the board of the World Professional Billiards and Snooker Association. 

Ellis returned to Aston Villa as chairman in 1982 and remained there until selling to Randy Lerner in 2006. Some fans blame him for the decline of the club after the European Cup victory in 1981–82. Within five years the club was relegated from the top flight, with many of the European Cup-winning team being sold to other teams, although it can be argued that this was due to large debts built up during the previous regime.

Ellis was nicknamed "Deadly Doug" by football pundit Jimmy Greaves, after sacking numerous managers during his tenures as chairman.  Aston Villa had 13 different managers during his two spells. Only two won any trophies for the team – Ron Atkinson and Brian Little with the Football League Cup in 1994 and 1996 respectively.

In 1996, Ellis owned 47 percent of Aston Villa. In May 1997 the club floated on the stock market with a valuation of £126m. Ellis sold a number of his shares at flotation, reducing his shareholding to around 39% of the total shares.

Ellis was reported to be the first football club director to pay himself a salary (in 2005 it was £290,000 after a 12% increase from the previous year) when it was made legal by The Football Association in the early 1980s. He also served on the boards of Birmingham City, Derby County and Wolverhampton Wanderers (as chairman).

In 2004, at the age of 80 and suffering from prostate cancer, Ellis agreed to relinquish some of his control of the club by appointing Bruce Langham as chief executive. Langham resigned in May 2005, reportedly after a disagreement with Ellis. In 2005, underwent a heart bypass operation and, after a three-month absence, returned to his role at Villa Park soon after the start of the 2005–06 season. By this time some supporters and former club managers criticised Ellis's alleged lack of ambition, noting that the club often struggled to bring in top players.

On 14 August 2006, it was announced that Ellis had agreed to sell the club to American billionaire, Randy Lerner in a deal worth £62.6 million. Ellis stood aside when the takeover was completed on 19 September 2006, becoming a President Emeritus (Life President) of the club.

Honours and later life
In 1994, a stand at Villa Park was named after Ellis. and in 2005, he was appointed an OBE in the 2005 New Year Honours List.

Ellis received an honorary degree from Aston University in July 2007. In January 2012 the Doug Ellis Learning Hub was opened at the University of Birmingham Medical School. Ellis donated £416,000 towards the feature. In April 2013, the newly refurbished Sir Doug Ellis Woodcock Sports Centre at Aston University opened, featuring a new sports hall and squash courts. This work was partly funded by Ellis. Also in 2012, Ellis donated £10,000 to the building of a new school gymnasium at Sutton Coldfield Grammar School for Girls. In his letter to the school, he wrote: "You clearly have a school to be proud of … and I wish you every success in achieving your goal".

On 4 March 2012, Ellis was knighted for his charity work. He died on 11 October 2018, aged 94.

References

1924 births
2018 deaths
Derby County F.C. directors
Aston Villa F.C. directors and chairmen
Birmingham City F.C. directors and chairmen
Wolverhampton Wanderers F.C. directors and chairmen
People from Cheshire West and Chester
Knights Bachelor
Officers of the Order of the British Empire
Fleet Air Arm personnel of World War II
People associated with Aston University
Military personnel from Cheshire